Favorite Flies and Their Histories - With many replies from practical anglers to inquiries concerning how, when and where to use them-Illustrated by Thirty-two colored plates of flies, six engravings of natural insects and eight reproductions of photographs is a fly fishing book written by Mary Orvis Marbury published in Boston in April 1892 by Houghton Mifflin.  It was considered by most fly fishers as the standard reference on flies in its era.

Synopsis
Favorite Flies is a unique volume that compiles the stories and images of popular American artificial flies of the late 19th century.  It is one of the earliest works to use chromolithography color plates.  Today, the original flies used to create the color plates are preserved in the American Museum of Fly Fishing in Manchester, Vermont.  The stories for each fly described in the volume were obtained through correspondence with fly fisherman and fly tiers throughout the U.S. and Canada.  The following is a typical story about the Professor, a popular wet-fly of time:

No. 192. The Professor was named after the much-loved Professor John Wilson (Christopher North), and the story of the fly is, that one time, when this famous angler Was fishing, he ran short of flies, and, to create something of a flylike appearance, he fastened the petals of buttercups on his hook, adding bits of leaves or grass to imitate the wings of a fly. This arrangement was so successful that it led to the making of the fly with a yellow silk body, since then was widely known as the Professor
Professor. - A prime favorite; use it on almost all casts when I see more than one fly. When using a black tail fly, I use a brown fly and a Professor for droppers; find it a good fly under general conditions, when using a Miller for tail fly; then use Professor for droppers. From a letter from W. David Tomlin ("Norman") Duluth, Minn as favorite flies for trout in Michigan streams.

Favorite Flies contains plates and stories for Bass Flies, Trout Flies, Hackles, Salmon Flies, and Lake Flies

Reviews

 The American Fly Fisher wrote in The Mary Orvis Marbury Fly Plates (1979):
The legacy of Mary Marbury, through her book and her leadership in Orvis's commercial fly-tying operation, is the standardization of American fly patterns.  Her book Favorite Flies and Their Histories, remains one of the most significant landmarks in American fly tying literature.
 Charles F. Waterman wrote in his A History of Angling (1981):
Mary Orvis Marbury, daughter of Charles F. Orvis, produced Favorite Flies and their Histories in 1892.  While it may not complete favorably with later works on entomology, it certainly is unique for its time.  It included a practical treatise on fly classification
 In 1988 Ann Barry of the New York Times wrote:
WHEN Mary Orvis Marbury died in 1914, the English Fishing Gazette acclaimed her as the most famous but one female angling author. (The other was Dame Juliana Berners, an Englishwoman who wrote A Treatyse of Fysshying Wyth an Angle in 1496.) Marbury's Favorite Flies and Their Histories, which became a best seller among anglers after it appeared in 1892 and went through nine printings by 1896, has recently been reprinted by the Wellfleet Press.
 In Royal Coachman-The Lore and Legends of Fly Fishing, Paul Schullery wrote:
Mary Orvis Marbury produced one of American fishing literature's milestone volumes, Favorite Flies and Their Histories (1892), which not only served generations as the bible of fly patterns but further strengthened the company's reputation for expertise and reliability
 Dr. Andrew Herd, noted fly fishing historian comments on Favorite Flies in his 2001 The Fly:
...the book which captured the American wet-fly tradition at its peak was Charles' [Orvis] daughter's Favorite Flies.  Mary ran the Orvis company's fly tying department and she was inspired to set pen to paper when she realised how little standardization there was among fly patterns...  The answers were compiled and key to colour plates in a book which was still in print sixty years later, such was its popularity

Contents

 Part I
 Insects, Natural and Artificial - 1
 History of the Red Hackle - 28
 Part II
 Prefatory - 45
 Histories of the favorite flies, accompanied by letters relating to their use in:
 Canada - 46
 Maine -
 Vermont and New Hampshire - 128
 Connecticut, Massachusetts, and Rhode Island - 144
 New York - 160
 Pennsylvania, New Jersey and Delaware - 226
 Virginia and West Virginia - 266
 Ohio - 306
 Missouri, Iowa, Indiana and Illinois - 334
 Michigan - 368
 Minnesota and Wisconsin - 392
 Maryland, Tennessee, Kentucky, Georgia and Mississippi - 406
 Florida, Louisiana, Texas, Arizona and Nevada - 418
 Colorado, Utah, Wyoming and Idaho - 432
 Montana - 448
 Washington - 472
 California - 482
 Oregon - 492
 "Hic Habitat Felicitas" - 510
 Index of Plates and Flies - 515
 List of Correspondents - 520
 List of Illustrations
 Disputing the Fly Question - Frontispiece
 Stoneflies - 13
 Drakes - 15
 Caddis Flies - 17
 Crane Flies and Spiders - 19
 House Flies and Ants - 21
 Beetles and Chrysopa - 23
 Plate A - Hackles - 27
 Plate B - Salmon Flies - 39
 Portrait of Charles F. Orvis - 45
 Plate C - Salmon Flies - 63
 Plate D - Salmon Flies - 81
 A Pleasant Memory - 93
 Plate E - Lake Flies - 95
 Plate F - Lake Flies - 113
 Plate G - Lake Flies - 125
 Plate H - Lake Flies - 139
 Plate I - Lake Flies - 157
 Plate J - Lake Flies - 171
 Plate K - Lake Flies - 189
 Plate L - Lake Flies - 199
 Plate M - Trout Flies - 221
 Plate N - Trout Flies - 239
 Plate O - Trout Flies - 255
 Equinox, the Edge of the Shadows - 261
 Plate P - Trout Flies - 277
 Plate Q - Trout Flies - 297
 Plate R - Trout Flies - 315
 Plate S - Trout Flies - 327
 Plate T - Trout Flies - 349
 Plate U - Trout Flies - 363
 Plate V - Trout Flies - 379
 Plate W - Bass Flies - 389
 Plate X - Bass Flies - 401
 Plate Y - Bass Flies - 413
 Plate Z - Bass Flies - 427
 Plate AA - Bass Flies - 441
 The Ondawa - 442
 "Up the Long Road" - 443
 Plate BB - Bass Flies - 457
 Manchester - 459
 Plate CC - Bass Flies - 469
 Plate DD - Bass Flies - 479
 Plate EE - Bass Flies - 489
 Plate FF - Bass Flies - 503
 "Hic Habitat Felicitas" - 510

Other editions

From Antiquarian Book Exchange:

See also
Bibliography of fly fishing

Notes

Further reading

External links
  Internet Archive Online Version

1892 non-fiction books
Angling literature
Fly fishing literature
American non-fiction books
Recreational fishing in the United States
Houghton Mifflin books